Francis Obiorah Obikwelu, GOIH (born 22 November 1978) is a retired Nigerian-born Portuguese sprinter, who specialized in 100 metres and 200 metres. He was the 2004 Olympic silver medalist in the 100 metres. In the same race, he set the former European record in the event at 9.86 seconds, which stood for nearly 17 years.

Biography
Obikwelu was born in Onitsha, Nigeria. At the age of 14, one of Obikwelu's football coaches noticed him and suggested he try out athletics. After two years, he represented Nigeria in the 1994 African Junior Championships and won the silver medal in the 400 metres.

Obikwelu moved to Lisbon, Portugal as a 16-year-old. After being rejected by both Sport Lisboa e Benfica and Sporting Clube de Portugal, he worked as a construction worker in the Algarve. He decided to learn Portuguese, and his teacher put him in contact with sports club Belenenses, where he resumed practising. While living in Portugal, Obikwelu was adopted by a lady who he now refers to as his "mother".

In July 2000, Lisbon-based Nigerian sprinter Mercy Nku said Obikwelu had decided to compete for Portugal because of neglect by Nigerian sports officials when he was injured while representing Nigeria in Sydney, Australia. "He had to go to Canada to undergo an operation on his knee spending his own money." Obikwelu became a Portuguese citizen in October 2001.

Obikwelu's athletics achievements, his life story and his personality made him a popular figure in Portugal, where he is nicknamed Chico, the short form of the Portuguese version of his first name.

Athletics career
Obikwelu holds the European record for the fastest time in the 100 m at 9.86 seconds. He finished second in the 100 m at the 2004 Summer Olympics in Athens, Greece, the first medal ever in athletics sprinting events for Portugal. He won 100 m and 200 m in 2006 at the European Championships in Athletics and became the first male athlete to win both 100 m and 200 m in the European Championship.

In the qualifiers at the 2004 Summer Olympics Obikwelu ran two times under ten seconds, setting a national record. In the final he recovered from a non-medal position in the second half of the race to win silver, just one-hundredth of a second behind Justin Gatlin and one-hundredth ahead of Maurice Greene, beating the former European record set by Linford Christie in 1993. Obikwelu finished fifth in the 200m.

Obikwelu was voted Waterford Crystal European Male Athlete of the Year for 2006 by the European Athletic Association, in an internet poll open to member federations, media and the general public.

Obikwelu announced his retirement from competitive athletics after failing to qualify for the 100 m finals in the 2008 Beijing Olympics, but retracted his statement, agreeing to honour the last year of his contract with his track club. Obikwelu won the 100 m gold medal at the 2009 Lusophony Games.

Statistics

Personal bests

All information from IAAF Profile

Awards and honours

Olympic Games
2nd 100 m, 2004 Athens, GRE 9.86
5th 200 m, 2004 Athens, GRE 20.14

World Championships
2nd 4 x 100 m Relay 1997 Athens, GRE 38.07
3rd 200 m 1999 Seville, ESP 20.11

World Indoor Championships
3rd 200 m 1997 Paris, FRA 21.10

European Indoor Championships
1st 60 m 2011 Paris, FRA 6.53

European Championships
1st 100 m 2002 Munich, GER
2nd 200 m 2002 Munich, GER
1st 100 m 2006 Goteborg, SWE 9.99
1st 200 m 2006 Goteborg, SWE 20.01

Golden League
1st 100 m 2004 Saint-Denis, FRA 10.06
1st 200 m 2004 Saint-Denis, FRA 20.12
1st 100 m 2001 Berlin, GER 9.98
2nd 100 m 2002 Brussels, BEL 10.01
3rd 200 m 2004 Zurich, SUI 20.36
3rd 200 m 2004 Bergen, NOR 20.46
1st 100 m 2008 Madrid. ESP 10.04

Grand Prix
1st 100 m 2002 Lausanne, SUI 10.09
3rd 200 m 2001 Athens, GRE 20.59
3rd 200 m 2001 Nice, FRA 20.41

Grand Prix Final
3rd 200 m 2001 Melbourne, AUS 20.52
5th 100 m 2002 Saint-Denis, FRA 10.03

Super Grand Prix
1st 200 m 2004 Madrid, ESP 20.29
2nd 100 m 2004 Lausanne, SUI 10.02
2nd 200 m 2003 Madrid, ESP 20.59

Obikwelu was the 1996 world junior champion over 100 m and 200 m.

Orders
 Grand Cross of the Order of Prince Henry

References

External links

 
 
 

1978 births
Living people
People from Onitsha
Nigerian male sprinters
Portuguese male sprinters
Olympic athletes of Nigeria
Athletes (track and field) at the 1996 Summer Olympics
Olympic athletes of Portugal
Olympic silver medalists for Portugal
Athletes (track and field) at the 2000 Summer Olympics
Athletes (track and field) at the 2004 Summer Olympics
Athletes (track and field) at the 2008 Summer Olympics
Medalists at the 2004 Summer Olympics
World Athletics Championships athletes for Nigeria
World Athletics Championships athletes for Portugal
World Athletics Championships medalists
European Athletics Championships medalists
Portuguese people of Nigerian descent
Portuguese sportspeople of African descent
Olympic silver medalists in athletics (track and field)
African Games gold medalists for Nigeria
African Games medalists in athletics (track and field)
European Athlete of the Year winners
Athletes (track and field) at the 1999 All-Africa Games
Black Portuguese sportspeople
World Athletics Indoor Championships medalists